Hurt may refer to:

 Suffering, pain or injury

Arts, entertainment, and media

Films and television
 Hurt (2003 film), a Canadian drama film
 Hurt (2009 film), an American horror film
 Hurt (2015 film), a Canadian documentary film
 Hurt (2018 film), an American horror film
 "Hurt" (The Shield), an episode of The Shield
 “Hurt”, an episode of The Good Doctor

Music

Groups
 Hurt (band), an American band
 Hurts (duo)

Albums
 Hurt (EP), by Hawthorne Heights
 Hurt: The EP, an extended play by British singer Leona Lewis which features a cover of the Nine Inch Nails song

Songs
 "Hurt" (Christina Aguilera song)
 "Hurt" (Nine Inch Nails song), covered by several other artists, most notably by Johnny Cash
 "Hurt" (Roy Hamilton song), covered by several other artists, most notably by Timi Yuro
 "Hurt" (T.I. song)
 "Hurt", a song by Dean Chamberlain on the 1980s LP "Code Blue", covered by Spock's Beard on their album Day for Night
 "Hurt", a song by Jamala on the 2013 album All or Nothing
 "Hurt", a song by NewJeans on the 2022 EP New Jeans
 "Hurt", a song by New Order on the single "Temptation"
 "Hurt", a song by Oliver Tree from his 2019 EP Do you Feel Me?
 "Hurt", a song by Re-Flex, from the album The Politics of Dancing
 "Hurt", a song by Tom Petty & the Heartbreakers on the album You're Gonna Get It!
 "Hurt", a song by Yung Lean, from the album Unknown Death 2002
"Hurts" (song), Emeli Sandé
 "The Hurt", a song by The Jacksons on the 1984 album Victory

Other uses
 Hurt (surname)
 Hurt, Virginia, United States
 Hurt, a blue roundel in heraldry
 Heterogeneous Urban RSTA Team, an aerial surveillance project in the United States

See also
 Hurst (disambiguation)
 Hurts (disambiguation)